Roger L. Jones is an American mathematician specializing in harmonic analysis and ergodic theory.

Biography
He obtained a B.S. in mathematics in 1971 from University at Albany, SUNY, and a Ph.D. in mathematics in 1974 from Rutgers University, with thesis Inequalities for the Ergodic Maximal Function written under the direction of Richard Floyd Gundy. He has recently retired from a professorship in mathematics at DePaul University in Chicago. There he taught everything from remedial math to graduate-level courses. During his tenure at DePaul, Roger published numerous research papers in math, was awarded an excellence in teaching award, chaired the DePaul University Mathematics Department, and was awarded National Science Foundation grants related to teaching mathematics. He has also worked with the Chicago Public Schools on improving math instruction.

Roger was honored for his research work at the International Conference on Harmonic Analysis and Ergodic theory that was held in the name of Roger and his colleague Marshall Ash.

Roger has since retired from teaching at DePaul and moved to Northern Wisconsin, where he teaches mathematics at Conserve School.

Appointments
 1974-1977: DePaul University, Assistant Professor
 1977-1984: DePaul University, Associate Professor
 1982-1985: DePaul University, Chairman: Department of Mathematics
 1984-2004: DePaul University, Professor
 2004–present: DePaul University, Professor Emeritus

Professional memberships
 Mathematical Association of America
 American Mathematical Society

Publications

References

External links
Roger Jones' DePaul Syllabus
Conference on Harmonic Analysis and Ergodic Theory

Living people
Year of birth missing (living people)
Rutgers University alumni
20th-century American mathematicians
21st-century American mathematicians
DePaul University faculty
University at Albany, SUNY alumni
Mathematical analysts
Mathematics educators